Walliswil bei Wangen is a municipality in the Oberaargau administrative district in the canton of Bern in Switzerland.

Geography
Of this area, 51.1% is used for agricultural purposes, while 34.5% is forested. Of the rest of the land, 10.1% is settled (buildings or roads) and the remainder (4.2%) is non-productive (rivers, glaciers or mountains).

Demographics
, 2.6% of the population was made up of foreign nationals. Over the last 10 years the population has grown at a rate of 3.2%. Most of the population speaks German  (98.7%), with French being second most common ( 0.5%) and Albanian being third ( 0.4%).

In the 2007 election the most popular party was the SVP which received 47.6% of the vote.  The next three most popular parties were the SPS (20.6%), the FDP (10%) and the Green Party (6.8%).

The age distribution of the population is children and teenagers (0–19 years old) make up 20.7% of the population, while adults (20–64 years old) make up 61.5% and seniors (over 64 years old) make up 17.8%.  In Walliswil bei Wangen about 77.2% of the population (between age 25-64) have completed either non-mandatory upper secondary education or additional higher education (either university or a Fachhochschule).

Walliswil bei Wangen has an unemployment rate of 2.28%.  , there were 26 people employed in the primary economic sector and about 10 businesses involved in this sector.  18 people are employed in the secondary sector and there are 8 businesses in this sector.  58 people are employed in the tertiary sector, with 11 businesses in this sector.

References

Municipalities of the canton of Bern